Gaisgill railway station was situated on the South Durham & Lancashire Union Railway between Tebay and Kirkby Stephen East. It served the village of Gaisgill. The station opened to passenger traffic on 8 August 1861, and closed on 1 December 1952.

References

 
 
 

South Durham and Lancashire Union Railway
Disused railway stations in Cumbria
Former North Eastern Railway (UK) stations
Railway stations in Great Britain opened in 1861
Railway stations in Great Britain closed in 1952
1861 establishments in England
1952 disestablishments in England
Tebay